Manfred Herzog (born 22 October 1946) is a German former water polo player. He competed in the men's tournament at the 1968 Summer Olympics.

References

External links
 

1946 births
Living people
German male water polo players
Olympic water polo players of East Germany
Water polo players at the 1968 Summer Olympics
People from Harz (district)
Sportspeople from Saxony-Anhalt